The 1968–69 Yugoslav First League season was the 23rd season of the First Federal League, the top level association football league of SFR Yugoslavia, since its establishment in 1946. Eighteen teams contested the competition, with Red Star winning their ninth national title.

Teams
Due to the expansion of the format from 16 to 18 teams at the end of the previous season no one was relegated. Bor and Čelik were promoted from the 1967–68 Yugoslav Second League.

League table

Results

Top scorers

See also
1968–69 Yugoslav Second League
1968–69 Yugoslav Cup

External links
Yugoslavia Domestic Football Full Tables

Yugoslav First League seasons
Yugo
1968–69 in Yugoslav football